Chillar Party is a 2011 Indian Hindi-language family comedy film jointly written and directed by debutantes Nitesh Tiwari and Vikas Bahl and produced by Ronnie Screwvala under UTV Spotboy and actor Salman Khan in his production debut under the Salman Khan Being Human Productions banner, based on a screenplay by Vijay Maurya. The film stars multiple debuting child artists in lead roles, with Shashank Shende, Pankaj Tripathi and Swara Bhasker in supporting roles. Ranbir Kapoor features in a dance song.

Chillar Party won the 2011 National Film Award for Best Children's Film.

Plot
Eight innocent but feisty kids lead carefree lives in Chandan Nagar, a colony in Mumbai, where each has his own identity and a nickname based on these qualities. Not only that, but their whole team has a nickname that has earned them significant notoriety. They explain that they have mainly two enemies - the 'oversized' neighbouring cricket team to whom they always lose, and a dog they named "Loose Motion" since she dirties their cricket pitch, so they develop an enmity against dogs. Their hopes are shattered shortly after a boy, Fatka, who was employed for washing the cars of the society, enters with his dog Bhidu. They do everything to throw the boy and his dog out, but become unsuccessful. Eventually they develop a friendship with each other as Fatka helps them by serving as the lead bowler during the match with the neighbouring cricket team. During this time, they also start interacting with a young girl who moves in, and an unemployed youngster who becomes successful after Fatka helps him out. But their happiness is short-lived when a reckless politician, welfare minister Shashikant Bhide, enters their life after his personal secretary Dubey is attacked by Bhidu for hurting Fatka.

Bhide announces in a news telecast that all the stray dogs roaming about in residential buildings in Mumbai will be caught and terminated, misleading audiences with a concern for public safety. He further informs that the dog(s) can only be saved if the society files a No Objection Certificate within 1 month. The kids, shocked by this, strive hard to get the NOC, wherein they have to get at least more than 50% votes of the total residents in the society i.e. 31 votes. But they manage only 10 votes after 15 days.

With more efforts gone in vain, the kids finally organize a march across the streets purely in underwears. This gains them enough traction to pull 10 more votes. With more hard work and awareness they manage to get another 10 votes counting a total of 30 votes. With only a day left for the deadline as declared by Bhide, they approach secretary L.N. Tandon, who is close to Bhide and has resented the kids all this while. Whilst all this chaos is going on, a TV channel invites Bhide and the kids for face-off. Seeing this as their last chance, they attend the interview which is being telecast across India. Knowing that that is the last day and dog catchers are after Bhidu, they pray hard to save him. During the interview they are constantly mocked by Bhide who questions their education and upbringing, but it soon takes a turn and culminates in the kids answering Bhide back with their moral education responses. Having won, the kids plead to leave after a moving speech by Fatka, and the interviewers agree. When they reach the society, they are disheartened as there is no sight of Bhidu. Suddenly, Bhidu comes jumping in, wearing a collar reading "Bhidu- Chandan Nagar Society". While they are happy seeing Baidu, they realize Tandon changed his mind after the face-off; he too is happy and seen cheering for them.

Cast
 Araav Khanna as Aflatoon
 Chinmai Chandranshuh as Lucky Singh / Panauti
 Divij Handa as Shaolin 
 Irfan Khan as Fatka 
 Naman Jain as Balwan Jhangiani / Janghya
 Rohan Grover as Ramashanker Iyer / Akram
 Sanath Menon as Arjun Saxena / Encyclopedia 
 Vedant Desai as Silencer
 Vishesh Tiwari as Laxman / Second Hand
 Shriya Sharma as Toothpaste 
 Rajesh Sharma as Chandan Nagar Secretary L.N. Tandon
Satyadeep Mishra as Advocate Saxena, Arjun's father
 Sonal Jha as Mrs. Saxena, Arjun's mother
 Sapna Sand as Janghya's mother
Swara Bhaskar as Talk show host
 Aakash Dahiya as Manish / RJ Manisha / Googly
Pankaj Tripathi as Dubey, minister Bhide's manager
 Shashank Shende as Minister Shashikant Bhide
 Indrayudh Mandal as Kartik 
 Sillo Mahava as Aunty
 Jaswinder Gardner as Shaolin's mother 
 Bachchan Pachera as Old Watchman
 Soumik Sen as Pakau 
 Rajendra Sethi as Mr. Jhangiani, Balwan's father
 Ranbir Kapoor's special appearance as himself in song Tai Tai Phish

Soundtrack
The music was composed by Amit Trivedi, while the lyrics were penned by Tiwari with Bahl, Trivedi and Amitabh Bhattacharya as guest lyricists.

Track listing

Reception

Critical reception

Chillar Party received mostly positive reviews from critics. Taran Adarsh of Bollywood Hungama gave it 3.5 out of 5 stars and said – "On the whole, Chillar Party is not just for kids, but for grownups as well. A story of grit and determination, it works not just as an entertainer, but also advocates a message rather strongly. A film that deserves to be tax-exempted so that it reaches out to a wider audience. A small film with a gigantic spirit... Encourage this one!" Saibal Chatterjee of NDTV rated it with 3 out of 5 stars and said – "Through the entire first half, the writer-director duo holds the proceedings at a level that is completely in sync with the unpretentious spirit of the film. In the run-up to the climax, however, the film comes precariously close to tying itself up in knots as the child-like aura it builds up begins to teeter on the edge of childishness. Mercifully, it stays on its feet and doesn't topple over. For that alone the film deserves at least three stars." Zee News gave the film 4 stars and wrote, "Chiller Party may be a small film. But as cinema goes, in its adroitness, it is much more mature than 99 percent of the films ever made in India. And that, you`ll reckon, is no `small` achievement." Sonia Chopra of Sify awarded it 4 stars saying, "Storytelling by co-directors-writers-lyricists Vikas Bahl and Nitesh Tiwari is first-rate. They make you deeply connect with the characters". Shivesh Kumar of IndiaWeekly awarded the movie 3 out of 5 stars. Preeti Arora of Rediff gave it 3 out of 5 stars and wrote – "Chillar Party is an enjoyable film with plenty of laughs. Do watch this, unless of course you hate kids." Vandana Krishnan from Behindwoods gave the film 3 out of 5 stars describing the film as "fun filled one that is sure to leave you with a smile and moist eyes. Humor, emotions, and siddhartha is my best friend entertainment and values- You can't ask for more." Oneindia.in gave 3 stars while commenting "On the whole, Chillar Party is not just for kids, but grownups also will enjoy the film equally. A story of great determination presented in an entertaining way is what makes Chillar Party a good watch.

Nikhat Kazmi of Times of India gave Chillar Party 2 out of 5 stars and said – "Filmmakers need to realize Indian teens are extremely smart and are fed on a regular diet of Cartoon Network and roller-coaster Hollywood kiddie's flicks. You got to have a story, adventure drama and pace." Soumil Shukla of FilmiTadka rated it with 2.5 out of five stars and wrote in his review – "despite its shortcomings, Chillar Party succeeds in overcoming a lot of deformations forced by the ‘formula’ philosophy on this genre of films. If not for anything else, watch it to enjoy the delightful performances from the young actors who are the real heroes of this film."

Box office
Chillar Party grossed  in India. Boxofficeindia, on the basis of the film's nett collections, declared it a Hit.

Accolades
Chillar Party won the 2011 National Film Award for Best Children's Film.
Along with this, it also won 2011 National Film Award for Best Child Artist and Best Screenplay (Original).

References

External links
 
 
 

2010s Hindi-language films
2011 films
Films set in Mumbai
Indian children's films
2010s children's comedy films
UTV Motion Pictures films
Films scored by Amit Trivedi
Best Children's Film National Film Award winners
Films whose writer won the Best Original Screenplay National Film Award
Films produced by Salman Khan
Films directed by Nitesh Tiwari
2011 comedy films
Films about dogs
Films about animal rights
Films about pets
Films directed by Vikas Bahl